Italian occult psychedelia (IOP) is a subgenre of Italian psychedelic music characterized by obscure atmospheres. Italian occult psychedelia was coined by journalist Antonio Ciarletta in an article published by Italian music magazine Blow Up, in January 2012.
A festival called Thalassa has occurred in Rome since 2013 to celebrate Italian occult psychedelia bands.

Characteristics
The music form has emerged as a form of hauntology, an engine of reactivation of an Italian collective memory. The features of this shared past are related to the imagery of Italian genre films as cannibal movies, spaghetti westerns, Italian B horror movies and their soundtracks, and are related also to the violent, obscure and esoteric folklore so well outlined in the essays of Ernesto De Martino and in the documentaries of Luigi Di Gianni. "The darkness of human mind and the superstitions of old religions are leit-motifs that run through Giallo films and the music of IOP bands is hardly surprising: Italy is a country bound by belief and superstitions."
Other references are the stories and the characters of Federico Fellini and Pier Paolo Pasolini. Musically, Italian occult psychedelia is a cross of post-punk, psychedelic rock, Italian progressive rock, Italian library music and "Mediterranean vibes." According to Rumore, also other influences that "goes from Krautrock to Italian B-movie soundtracks, from drones to analog electronics, from lysergic folk to free jazz." According to Joseph Stannard, "It's equally clear that Italian occult psychedelia is far from sonically homogeneous." Simon Reynolds identifies italian occult psychedelia as an Italian counterpart to hauntology.

References

External links

IOP at Rai Radio3
SentireAscoltare IOP festival 
Distorsioni.net IOP festival third edition review 
OndaRock 
In Zaire on Il Mucchio Selvaggio 
IOP at Rai Radio3
Fact Magazine preview IOP song 
Distorsioni.net IOP festival second edition review 
Blow Up IOP part 2
Donato Epiro interview 
Lay Llamas on Rocket Recordings 
IOP at Rai Radio3
Martin Hagfors  interview 
IOP and Italian Indie

Psychedelic music
Hauntology